Blackcaps or blackcap may refer to:

 Black Caps or BLACKCAPS, the New Zealand national cricket team
 Blackcap, a European songbird of the warbler family
 Black caps, some species of black raspberry
 Black cap raspberry (Rubus occidentalis), a species of Rubus native to eastern North America

See also
 Black Cap (disambiguation)
 Blackcap (disambiguation)